The Stolpersteine in Prague-Josefov lists the Stolpersteine in the town quarter Josefov of Prague, the former Jewish quarter of the city. Stolpersteine is the German name for stumbling blocks collocated all over Europe by German artist Gunter Demnig. They remember the fate of the Nazi victims being murdered, deported, exiled or driven to suicide.

Generally, the stumbling blocks are posed in front of the building where the victims had their last self-chosen residence. The name of the Stolpersteine in Czech is: Kameny zmizelých, stones of the disappeared.

The project in the Czech Republic, namely in Josefov, was launched in 2008 by the Czech Union of Jewish Students.

Josefov 

Josefov is a town quarter and the smallest cadastral area of Prague, formerly the Jewish quarter of the town. It is completely surrounded by the Old Town (Czech: Staré Město pražské). Jews supposedly settled in Prague as early as the 10th century. In 1096 the first pogrom (the first crusade) took place. Eventually all Jews were concentrated within the Ghetto, shut off from the outside world by fortified walls with gates (1230–1530). As early as in the 11th, 12th and 13th century, Prague developed into a center of rabbinical scholarship and formed a school of Tosafists. In 1262 Přemysl Otakar II issued a Statuta Judaeorum which granted the community a certain degree of self-administration. On Easter Sunday of 1389 one of the worst pogroms took place, the probable number of victims during the massacre range from about 500 to more than 3,000.

The ghetto was most prosperous towards the end of the 16th century and at the beginning of the 17th century when Judah Loew ben Bezalel served as Rabbi, when a Yeshiva was founded and when the Jewish Mayor, Mordecai Maisel, became the Minister of Finance. The very wealthy man helped develop the ghetto. By then, Prague was seen as a Hebrew metropolis in Central Europe. By 1638 the Jewish population of Prague had increased to more than 7.800. In 1744 Empress Maria Theresa ordered all Jews to leave the city. Four years later they were allowed to return. In 1848 Jews were granted permission to settle also outside the ghetto. The small district supposedly housed about 18,000 inhabitants at a certain time. Soon the wealthy Jews moved to less crowded areas. In 1850 the quarter was renamed "Josefstadt" (Joseph's City) after Emperor Joseph II who emancipated Jews with the Toleration Edict in 1781. Gradually the share of the Jewish population in Josefov decreased, with mainly orthodox and poor Jews remaining there. Between 1893 and 1913 most of the quarter was demolished as part of a restoration of the city following the model of Paris. Due to protests of inhabitants six synagogues could be saved, furthermore the old cemetery and the Old Jewish Town Hall. They are now all part of the Jewish Museum in Prague. A new boulevard with luxurious buildings and shops was created, the Paris Street (Czech: Parížská). Only rich Jews could afford housing in the newly built blocks, the poorer ones moved away. Josefov lost its traditional identity and the quarter was integrated in the Old Town.

In the 19th century, Jews got caught up in the culture wars between Czech-speaking middle class and German-speaking members of the Austro-Hungarian empire. Beginning in the 1830s many Jews began to adopt German and tried hard to assimilate. In the 1870s, however, Czech nationalism increased substantially and by the last quarter of the 19th Century, a network of Czech-Jewish institutions was created. Not all Jews supported this trend, many remained faithful to German language and culture while others favored the upcoming Zionism. Conflict between the Zionists and the Czech Jewish nationalists evolved and the Jewish community was deeply divided. German speaking and writing Jews as Franz Kafka, Max Brod and Franz Werfel became world-famous novelists of the early 20th century.

Immediately after the destruction of Czechoslovakia by Hitler and the unlawful invasion of Nazi troops in Prague all Czech Jews became victims of several sanctions. In June 1939, Adolf Eichmann arrived in Prague, confiscated a Jewish villa in Stresovice and established The Central Office for Jewish Emigration. He forced the Jewish representatives Emil Kafka and Jakob Edelstein to comply with all his orders. At that time approximately 56,000 Jews lived in Prague. They were step by step excluded from economic life, deprived of their property, segregated in Prague restaurants and prohibited from using public baths and swimming pools. They were excluded from the movie and theatre industries, restricted to the back of the second car on Prague trams and excluded from all hotels except the Fiser and the Star. They had to wear the Judenstern and were banned from public service and all social, cultural and economic organizations. In August 1940 Jewish children were excluded from Czech schools and in October Jews were denied access to a wide range of rationed goods. On 10 October 1941 Reinhard Heydrich, Karl Hermann Frank and Eichmann developed the plan to deport all Jews from the Protectorate of Bohemia and Moravia to Łódź Ghetto, Minsk and Riga, and to establish Theresienstadt concentration camp. The Holocaust had begun.

The quarter is often represented by the flag of Prague's Jewish community, a yellow Magen David (Star of David) on a red field.

Methodological problems 
A scientifically correct list of all Stolpersteine in Prague does not exist. Neither the artist, nor the organizers of the collocations do know exactly how many Stolpersteine have been posed in Prague and where they have been collocated. The website stolpersteine.cz all of a sudden disappeared in late 2016. Therefore, this list constitutes a work-in-progress. Step by step all Prague districts will be visited and all available addresses will be checked. Nevertheless, at this point we cannot guarantee that the list below contains all Stolpersteine of Josefov. You can help by adding reliable sources and additional information — either on this page or on the talk page. If you have general remarks please use the talk page of the WikiProject Stolpersteine.

The lists are sortable; the basic order follows the alphabet according to the last name of the victim.

List of Stolpersteine

Memorial plaques 
The following memorial plaques have not been created by Gunter Demnig, they constitute imitations. Their inscriptions are not in Czech but in English and the engravings were not done by hand but mechanically. The collocation dates are unknown, but as there is a picture from 25 January 2010 with the memorial plaques already in place the collocations must have happened before that date.

Misleading informations 
The now defunct website stolpersteine.cz included in their list also stumbling blocks for Gabriele Hermannová and Otílie Davidová, two of the three sisters of  novelist Franz Kafka. These Stolpersteine were listed with the address Bílkova 132/4. Several tourists were misled and could not find the memorial plaques. The three Stolpersteine for two of the Kafka sisters and their maid were produced but never collocated. For unknown reasons the family had withdrawn its consent shortly before the collocation.

Dates of collocations 
According to the website of Gunter Demnig the Stolpersteine of Prague were posed by the artist himself on the following days: 
 8 October 2008: Jáchymova 63/3
 7 November 2009: Maiselova 60/3
 12 June 2010
 13 to 15 July 2011 
 17 July 2013

A further collocation occurred on 28 October 2012, but is not mentioned on Demnig's page.

The Czech Stolperstein project was initiated in 2008 by the Česká unie židovské mládeže (Czech Union of Jewish Youth) and was realized with the patronage of the Mayor of Prague.

See also 
 List of cities by country that have stolpersteine
 Stolpersteine in the Czech Republic

External links
 stolpersteine.eu, Demnig's website
 holocaust.cz

References

Josefov